Libya is a predominantly Arab-Berber country with many people of descent identifying as Arabs and Berbers. 
 The Arab and Berber population has traditionally held racist views towards black-skinned, sub-Saharan Africans (although Libya does have indigenous Black populations including the Black Arabs and Black Berbers) although it's not all of them it's still prevalent among the country. The New York Times argues that Libya has a "long history of racist violence."

In the 21st century, significant numbers of sub-Saharan Africans came to Libya, primarily to work as unskilled labor. In recent years, a number of racist incidents targeting Black migrants have been reported. According to Peter Bouckaert of Human Rights Watch, the incidents targeting migrants and refugees reflect "a deep-seated racism and anti-African sentiment in Libyan society."

The clashes between Misrata and the black-majority town of Tawergha had some racist overtones, present before the start of the civil war. Rebel slogans like "the brigade for purging slaves, black skin" were scrawled on the road between Misrata and Tawregha.

See also
 Racism by country
 Racism in the Middle East
 Slavery in Libya

References

 
Libya
Arab
Libya
Anti-black racism in Africa